Chimento is a surname. Notable people with the surname include:

Adriano Chimento, Italian jeweller and businessman
Enrique Chimento, Argentinian footballer
Marcelo Chimento (born 1964), Argentine actor

Surnames of Italian origin